Steven R. Riggs (born in 1959 in Louisville, Kentucky) is an American politician and a Democratic member of the Kentucky House of Representatives representing District 31 since January 1991 until retiring in 2018. Riggs was elected to fourteen terms.

Education and background
Riggs earned his BBA from the University of Kentucky. He was first elected to the chamber in 1990. Riggs' professional experience includes working as an insurance agent and consultant. He also served as a Flotilla Commander in the United States Coast Guard Auxiliary.

Riggs served as chairman of the Local Government Committee with jurisdiction over cities, counties, and special districts.  He was the senior ranking member of the Banking & Insurance Committee.  Riggs was also named the President of the National Council of Insurance Legislators (NCOIL) in 2017.

Elections
2012 Riggs was unopposed for the May 22, 2012 Democratic Primary and was unopposed for the November 6, 2012 General election, winning with 11,886 votes (57.6%) against Republican nominee Nicholas Simon.
Early 1990s Riggs was initially elected in the 1990 Democratic Primary and the November 6, 1990 General election and re-elected in the general election of November 3, 1992.
1994 Riggs was unopposed for the 1994 Democratic Primary and won the November 8, 1994 General election against Republican nominee Michael Shaw.
1996 Riggs was unopposed for the 1996 Democratic Primary and the November 5, 1996 General election against Republican nominee Jim Kute.
1998 Riggs and returning 1996 Republican challenger Jim Kute were both unopposed for their 1998 primaries, setting up a rematch; Riggs won the November 3, 1998 General election against Kute.
2000 Riggs was unopposed for the 2000 Democratic Primary and won the November 7, 2000 General election with 11,401 votes (53.5%) against Republican nominee Stuart Benson.
2002 Riggs was unopposed for the 2002 Democratic Primary and won the November 5, 2002 General election with 9,225 votes (60.5%) against Republican nominee Darroll Hawkins.
2004 Riggs and returning 2002 Republican challenger Darroll Hawkins were both unopposed for their 2004 primaries, setting up a rematch; Riggs won the November 2, 2004 General election with 11,986 votes (57.7%) against Hawkins.
2006 Riggs was unopposed for both the 2006 Democratic Primary and the November 7, 2006 General election, winning with 11,053 votes after a challenger withdrew.
2008 Riggs was unopposed for both the 2008 Democratic Primary and the November 4, 2008 General election, winning with 15,505 votes.
2010 Riggs was unopposed for both the May 18, 2010 Democratic Primary and the November 2, 2010 General election, winning with 10,820 votes.

References

External links
Official page at the Kentucky General Assembly

Steven Riggs at Ballotpedia
Steve Riggs at OpenSecrets
Official website is www.SteveRiggs.org
National Council of Insurance Legislators www.ncoil.org

1959 births
Living people
Democratic Party members of the Kentucky House of Representatives
Politicians from Louisville, Kentucky
University of Kentucky alumni
21st-century American politicians